The Thomas A. Simone Memorial Football Award is presented yearly to the most outstanding high school football player in the Kansas City Metropolitan Area.  The award was created in 1931 by Dr. D. M. Nigro and continued until Dr. Nigro's death in 1976.  The award was reinstated by Mr. and Mrs. Anthony Simone as a tribute to their 12-year-old son Tommy. The award is selected by a vote of the Greater Kansas City Football Coaches Association (GKCFCA), head coaches in the metro area and selected media members.

It is one of the Simone Awards presented annually to players, coaches and broadcasters  for their outstanding contributions to high school football in the Kansas City area

The Greater Kansas City Football Coaches Association, as well as select area media members, are responsible for the administration of the Thomas A. Simone Award and the other awards presented annually as part of the Simone Awards.

Previous winners

References
Footnotes

External links
Simone Awards

High school football trophies and awards in the United States
High school football in Missouri
High school sports in Kansas
Sports in the Kansas City metropolitan area
Awards established in 1983